Lorinseria is a genus of  fern in the subfamily Woodwardioideae of the family Blechnaceae. Its only species is Lorinseria areolata (synonym Woodwardia areolata), the netted chain fern, native to eastern North America. The monotypic genus Lorinseria has been separated from  Woodwardia in the Pteridophyte Phylogeny Group classification of 2016 (PPG I), on the basis of its anastamosing veins and lobed frond form, as well as its more marked frond dimorphism. However, the genus name Lorinseria appears to be a later homonym of Lorinsera Opiz, and will need to be replaced or conserved.

The sterile fronds are 40–60 cm long, and the fertile fronds 50–70 cm long.

It is superficially similar to Onoclea sensibilis and sometimes confused with it.

Distribution and habitat
This species is native to the southeast United States, but ranges all the way up the East Coast of the United States and Canada to southern Nova Scotia.  It favors moist, sandy, acid soils, and has appeared in areas in the interior of the US around acid mine seeps, thus being one of the few species to benefit from acid mine drainage.

References

Flora of North America: Woodwardia areolata

External links

Blechnaceae
Monotypic fern genera